The 22147 / 22148 Dadar Central–Sainagar Shirdi Weekly Superfast Express is a Superfast train belonging to Central Railway zone that runs between Dadar Central and  in India. It is currently being operated with 22147/22148 train numbers on a weekly basis.

Service

The 22147/Dadar Central–Sainagar Shirdi Superfast Express has an average speed of 55 km/hr and covers 332 km in 6h. The 22148/Sainagar Shirdi–Dadar Central Superfast Express has an average speed of 55 km/hr and covers 332 km in 6h.

Route & Halts 

The important halts of the train are:

Coach composition

The train has standard ICF rakes with max speed of 110 kmph. The train consists of 18 coaches:

 1 AC II Tier
 2 AC III Tier
 7 Sleeper coaches
 6 General Unreserved
 2 Seating cum Luggage Rake

Traction

Both trains are hauled by a Kalyan Loco Shed-based WDM-3D diesel locomotive from Dadar to Shirdi.

Rake sharing

The train shares its rake with 11001/11002 Sainagar Shirdi–Pandharpur Express and 12131/12132 Dadar Central–Sainagar Shirdi Superfast Express.

Direction reversal

The train reverses its direction at;

 .

See also 

 Dadar Central railway station
 Sainagar Shirdi railway station
 Dadar Central–Sainagar Shirdi Superfast Express
 Sainagar Shirdi–Pandharpur Express

Notes

References

External links 

 22147/Dadar–Sainagar Shirdi Superfast Express India Rail Info
 22148/Sainagar Shirdi–Dadar Superfast Express India Rail Info

Transport in Mumbai
Transport in Shirdi
Express trains in India
Rail transport in Maharashtra
Railway services introduced in 2017